Christian Geistdörfer (born 1 February 1953 in Munich) is a German former rally co-driver. His career in motorsport lasted from 1975 to 1990. From 1977 to 1987, he co-drove to German rally driver Walter Röhrl, winning the World Rally Championship drivers' title in 1980 and 1982. The pair also won the Monte Carlo Rally four times. After Röhrl retired from the WRC, Geistdörfer co-drove to Hannu Mikkola in eight events in 1988 and 1989.

External links
 Official website
 Geistdörfer at rallybase.nl

1953 births
Living people
Sportspeople from Munich
German rally co-drivers
World Rally Championship co-drivers